The Drummer is a 2020 American drama film directed by Eric Werthman and starring Danny Glover, who also serves as an executive producer of the film. The film premiered at the 2020 Woodstock Film Festival.

Cast
Danny Glover as Mark Walker
Prema Cruz as Cori
Sam Underwood as Darien Cooper
Daniel K. Isaac as Mike
Camilla Perez as Maria
Frankie J. Alvarez as Nate
Jennifer Mudge as Alison Layton
Lillias White as Roberta
Nikola Balać as Christian

Release
1091 Pictures acquired North American distribution rights to the film in July 2021.  The film was released on November 9, 2021.

Reception
The film has an 80% rating on Rotten Tomatoes based on five reviews.

Bob Strauss of the San Francisco Chronicle gave the film a negative review and wrote, "Defined only by their scars, all three lead characters feel generic, as if Werthman built them out of archetypes that ran through his case studies."

Robert Daniels of RogerEbert.com awarded the film three stars and wrote, "But it flourishes as a modest picture, an acute character study of men and women picking up the pieces of a patriotic ideal that seems to have failed them."

References

External links
 
 

2020 films
2020 drama films
American drama films
2020s English-language films
1091 Pictures films
2020s American films